Simon Brehm (31 December 1921 – 11 February 1967) was a Swedish double-bass player and, later in life, a record producer and owner of Karusell Records. He was the manager of the singer Lill-Babs and was the leader of the orchestra that played in the TV show Hylands hörna from 1962.

Discography

With Quincy Jones
Jazz Abroad (Emarcy, 1955)
Quincy's Home Again (Metronome, 1958) - also released as Harry Arnold + Big Band + Quincy Jones = Jazz! (EmArcy)

References

Bebop double-bassists
Swedish jazz double-bassists
Swedish record producers
Swedish people of Jewish descent
1921 births
1967 deaths
20th-century double-bassists
20th-century Swedish male musicians
20th-century Swedish musicians